Intraco I is a skyscraper in Warsaw, by Swedish company Byggnadsproduktion AB. The skyscraper is located at Stawki street, at the border of two districts Śródmieście and Żoliborz, close to the Dworzec Gdański metro and train station. The total height of the building, including its antenna is 138 metres. The building has 39 stories with a total area 31500 square metres.

The elevation of the building was completely refurbished in 1998 and it has changed colour of curtain wall from orange to light green/cyan.

Intraco I is a typical high-rise office building, its interior standard is very high and spacious. The building also has an underground car park for 200 cars. Offices in the building occupy all floors. Inside the building there are also two restaurants, many conference rooms, a bar and kiosk, other miscellaneous stores, and a spa and sauna. All rooms in the building are air-conditioned and have satellite and internet connection.

See also

 List of tallest buildings in Warsaw
 North gate
 Dworzec Gdański metro station
 Warszawa Gdańska station

Skyscrapers in Warsaw